Remuera railway station is a station serving the suburb of Remuera in Auckland, New Zealand. It is served by the Southern Line and the Onehunga Line, and consists of an island platform which is accessed by a ramp from the Market Road motorway overbridge. The station was opened in 1873. It includes a weatherboard and tile station building, typical of those designed by George Troup.

Services
Auckland One Rail, on behalf of Auckland Transport, operates suburban services on the Southern Line and Onehunga Line. All Southern Line services stop at Remuera. Since 26 August 2018, Onehunga Line services stop only in the evenings. The typical weekday off-peak timetable in trains per hour (tph) is:
3 tph to Britomart
3 tph to Papakura

See also 
 List of Auckland railway stations

References 

Rail transport in Auckland
Railway stations in New Zealand
Heritage New Zealand Category 1 historic places in the Auckland Region